Zambelli is a surname. Notable people with the surname include:

Andrea Zambelli (1927-1994), Italian bobsledder
Carlotta Zambelli (1875-1968), Italian ballerina
Corrado Zambelli (1897-1974), Italian classical bass
Eugenio Zambelli (born 1948), Italian singer
George Zambelli (1924-2003), American fireworks entertainer
Henri Zambelli (born 1957), French footballer
Marco Zambelli (born 1985), Italian footballer